This is a list of Chinese naval vessels from the Qing Dynasty to the end of World War II (1644-1945), including vessels of the Imperial Chinese Navy (1875-1912), the Republican Beiyang Fleet (1912-1928) and the Republic of China Navy (1924-1945):

Notes

References

Lists of ships of China
Military history of the Qing dynasty
Naval history of China
Naval ships of China